Below a list of all national champions in the men's 100 metres in track and field from several countries since 1970.

Argentina

1970: Pedro Bassart
1971: Pedro Bassart
1972: Pedro Bassart
1973: Gustavo Dubarbier
1974: Pedro Bassart
1975: Gustavo Dubarbier
1976: Carlos Martínez
1977: Gustavo Dubarbier
1978: Gustavo Dubarbier
1979: Gustavo Dubarbier
1980: Gustavo Dubarbier
1981: Nicolás Duncan Glass
1982: Hugo Alzamora
1983: Oscar Barrionuevo
1984: Oscar Barrionuevo
1985: Oscar Barrionuevo
1986: Gerardo Meinardi
1987: Gabriel Somma
1988: Claudio Arcas
1989: Alejandro Terzián
1990: Alejandro Terzián
1991: Claudio Molocznik
1992: Guillermo Cacián
1993: Carlos Gats
1994: Carlos Gats
1995: Gabriel Simón
1996: Carlos Gats
1997: Carlos Gats
1998:Gabriel Simón
1999: Gabriel Simón
2000: Gabriel Simón
2001: Gabriel Simón
2002: Gabriel Simón
2003: Matías Usandivaras
2004: Matías Usandivaras
2005: Iván Altamirano
2006: Iván Altamirano

Australia

1970: Eric Bigby
1971: Eric Bigby
1972: Laurie D'Arcy (NZL)
1973: David Stokes
1974: Graham Haskell
1975: Graham Haskell
1976: Greg Lewis
1977: Paul Narracott
1978: Paul Narracott
1979: Paul Narracott
1980: Richard James
1981: Peter Gandy
1982: Paul Narracott
1983: Paul Narracott
1984: Paul Narracott
1985: Fred Martin
1986: Gerrard Keating
1987: Shane Naylor
1988: Shane Naylor
1989: David Dworjanyn
1990: Tim Jackson
1991: Dean Capobianco
1992: Shane Naylor
1993: Dean Capobianco
1994: Damien Marsh
1995: Shane Naylor
1996: Damien Marsh
1997: Steve Brimacombe
1998: Matt Shirvington
1999: Matt Shirvington
2000: Matt Shirvington
2001: Matt Shirvington
2002: Matt Shirvington
2003: Patrick Johnson
2004: Joshua Ross
2005: Joshua Ross
2006: Joshua Ross
2007: Joshua Ross
2008: Otis Gowa
2009: Joshua Ross
2010: Aaron Rouge-Serret
2011: Aaron Rouge-Serret
2012: Joshua Ross
2013: Joshua Ross
2014: Tim Leathart
2015: Joshua Clarke
2016: Alexander Hartmann

The Bahamas

2004: Dominic Demeritte
2005: Derrick Atkins
2006: Derrick Atkins
2007: Derrick Atkins
2008: Derrick Atkins
2009: Derrick Atkins
2010: Adrian Griffith
2011: Adrian Griffith
2012: Derrick Atkins
2013: Derrick Atkins
2014: Shavez Hart
2015: Shavez Hart

Barbados

2003: Andrew Hinds
2006: Andrew Hinds
2008: Andrew Hinds
2009: Andrew Hinds
2011: Andrew Hinds
2013: Ramon Gittens
2015: Levi Cadogan

Belarus

1992: Sergey Kornelyuk
1993: Leonid Safronnikov
1994: Aleksandr Shlychkov (UKR)
1995: Sergey Kornelyuk
1996: Sergey Kornelyuk
1997: Sergey Kornelyuk 
1998: Leonid Safronnikov
1999: Aleksandr Slyunkov 
2000: Yuriy Rydeyskiy
2001: Aleksandr Slyunkov
2002: Vyacheslav Aliyey
2003: Yuriy Bagatka
2004: Dmitriy Golub 
2005: Maksim Pisunov
2006: Maksim Pisunov
2007: ???
2008: ???
2009: Ivan Dymar
2010: Aliaksandr Linnik

Belgium

1970: Paul Poels
1971: Jean-Pierre Borlée
1972: Mario Demarchi
1973: Guy Stas
1974: Lambert Micha
1975: Fons Brydenbach
1976: Frank Verhelst
1977: Lambert Micha
1978: Ronald Desruelles
1979: Ronald Desruelles
1980: Frank Verhelst
1981: Jacques Borlée
1982: Ronald Desruelles
1983: Jacques Borlée
1984: Ronald Desruelles
1985: Ronald Desruelles
1986: Ronald Desruelles
1987: Ronald Desruelles
1988: Patrick Stevens
1989: Patrick Stevens
1990: Patrick Stevens
1991: Patrick Stevens
1992: Patrick Stevens
1993: Patrick Stevens
1994: Patrick Stevens
1995: Patrick Stevens
1996: Erik Wijmeersch
1997: Patrick Stevens
1998: Erik Wijmeersch
1999: Patrick Stevens
2000: Patrick Stevens
2001: Nathan Bongelo Bongelemba
2002: Erik Wijmeersch
2003: Xavier De Baerdemaker
2004: Patrick Stevens
2005: Anthony Ferro
2006: Anthony Ferro
2007: Kristof Beyens
2008: Erik Wijmeersch
2009: Jean Marie Louis
2010: Wout Verhoeven
2011: Wout Verhoeven
2012: Julien Watrin
2013: Damien Broothaerts
2014: Chamberry Muaka
2015: Yannick Meyer
2016: Andreas Vranken

Brazil

1991: Robson da Silva
1992: Robson da Silva
1993: Robson da Silva
1994: Sidney Telles de Souza
1995: Robson da Silva
1996: Arnaldo da Silva
1997: André da Silva
1998: Claudinei da Silva
1999: Claudinei da Silva
2000: Vicente de Lima
2001: Claudinei da Silva and Raphael de Oliveira
2002: Vicente de Lima
2003: Édson Ribeiro
2004: Vicente de Lima
2005: Vicente de Lima
2006: José Carlos Moreira
2007: Sandro Viana
2008: Vicente de Lima
2009: José Carlos Moreira
2010: Jefferson Liberato Lucindo
2011: Bruno de Barros
2012: José Carlos Moreira
2013: José Carlos Moreira
2014: Bruno de Barros
2015: Vitor Hugo dos Santos

Canada

1970: Charlie Francis
1971: Charlie Francis
1972: Herman Carter
1973: Charlie Francis
1974: Hugh Fraser
1975: Hugh Fraser
1976: Cole Doty
1977: Hugh Fraser
1978: Hugh Fraser
1979: Desai Williams
1980: Desai Williams
1981: Desai Williams
1982: Tony Sharpe
1983: Desai Williams
1984: Ben Johnson
1985: Ben Johnson
1986: Ben Johnson
1987: Ben Johnson
1988: Ben Johnson
1989: Bruny Surin
1990: Bruny Surin
1991: Bruny Surin
1992: Glenroy Gilbert
1993: Atlee Mahorn
1994: Glenroy Gilbert
1995: Donovan Bailey
1996: Robert Esmie
1997: Donovan Bailey
1998: Bruny Surin
1999: Bruny Surin
2000: Bruny Surin
2001: Donovan Bailey
2002: Nicolas Macrozonaris
2003: Nicolas Macrozonaris
2004: Pierre Browne
2005: Pierre Browne
2006: Nicolas Macrozonaris
2007: Nicolas Macrozonaris
2008: Pierre Browne
2009: Bryan Barnett
2010: Sam Effah
2011: Sam Effah
2012: Justyn Warner
2013: Aaron Brown
2014: Gavin Smellie
2015: Andre De Grasse
2016: Andre De Grasse
2017: Andre De Grasse
2018: Aaron Brown
2019: Aaron Brown

Denmark

1970: Søren Viggo Pedersen
1971: Søren Viggo Pedersen
1972: Søren Viggo Pedersen
1973: Søren Viggo Pedersen
1974: Søren Viggo Pedersen
1975: Jens Hansen
1976: Ole Lysholt
1977: Jens Hansen
1978: Ole Lysholt
1979: Jens Smedegård (Hansen)
1980: Jens Smedegård
1981: Jens Smedegård
1982: Carl Emil Falbe Hansen
1983: Peter Regli
1984: Lars Pedersen
1985: Lars Pedersen
1986: Morten Kjems
1987: Peter Regli
1988: Lars Pedersen
1989: Lars Pedersen
1990: Lars Pedersen
1991: Lars Pedersen
1992: Lars Pedersen
1993: Claus Hirsbro
1994: Lars Pedersen
1995: Christian Trajkovski
1996: Claus Hirsbro
1997: Benjamin Hecht
1998: Benjamin Hecht
1999: Christian Trajkovski
2000: Christian Trajkovski
2001: Morten Jensen
2002: Morten Jensen
2003: Morten Jensen
2004: Morten Jensen
2005: Morten Jensen
2006: Morten Jensen
2007: Morten Jensen
2008: Martin Krabbe
2009: Jesper Simonsen
2010: Jesper Simonsen
2011: Andreas Trajkovski
2012: Frederik Thomsen
2019: Frederik Schou

Estonia

1917*: Johannes Villemson
1918*: Johannes Villemson
1919*: Johannes Villemson
1920: Reinhold Saulmann
1921: Konstantin Pereversin
1922: Konstantin Pereversin
1923: Reinhold Kesküll
1924: Konstantin Pereversin
1925: Reinhold Kesküll
1926: Elmar Rähn
1927: Edgar Labent
1928: Edgar Labent
1929: Edgar Labent
1930: Valter Korol
1931: Valter Rattus
1932: Nikolai Küttis
1933: Rudolf Tomson
1934: Rudolf Tomson
1935: Ruudi Toomsalu
1936: Ruudi Toomsalu
1937: Ruudi Toomsalu
1938: Ruudi Toomsalu
1939: Georg Vuht
1940: Harry Aumere
1941: -
1942: Konstantin Ivanov
1943: Vadim Palm
1944: Heino Koik
1945: Konstantin Ivanov
1946: Heldur Tüüts
1947: Georg Gilde
1948: Georg Gilde
1949: Endel Küllik
1950: Georg Gilde
1951: Uno Liiv
1952: Georg Gilde
1953: Uno Liiv
1954: Heino Heinlo
1955: Uno Kiiroja
1956: Uno Kiiroja
1957: Heino Heinlo
1958: Toomas Kitsing
1959: Uno Kiiroja
1960: Uno Kiiroja
1961: Eino Ojastu
1962: Toomas Kitsing
1963: Toomas Kitsing
1964: Jüri Liigand
1965: Jüri Liigand
1966: Jüri Liigand
1967: Boris Nugis and Eduard Püve
1968: Jüri Liigand
1969: Viktor Kirilenko
1970: Avo Oja
1971: Kalju Jurkatamm
1972: Jüri Liigand
1973: Paul Nagel
1974: Andres Luka
1975: Gennadi Organov
1976: Gennadi Organov
1977: Gennadi Organov
1978: Gennadi Organov
1979: Jevgeni Jessin
1980: Jevgeni Jessin
1981: Mihhail Urjadnikov
1982: Mihhail Urjadnikov
1983: Mihhail Urjadnikov
1984: Mihhail Urjadnikov
1985: Andrus Möll
1986: Andrus Möll
1987: Andrus Möll
1988: Enn Lilienthal
1989: Enn Lilienthal
1990: Andrei Morozov
1991: Andrei Morozov
1992: Andrei Morozov
1993: Andrei Morozov
1994: Andrei Morozov
1995: Andrei Morozov
1996: Rainis Jaansoo
1997: Rainis Jaansoo
1998: Tanel Soosaar
1999: Erki Nool
2000: Maidu Laht
2001: Garol Pärn
2002: Argo Golberg
2003: Argo Golberg
2004: Allar Aasma
2005: Henri Sool
2006: Marek Niit
2007: Henri Sool
2008: Marek Niit
2009: Richard Pulst
2010: Richard Pulst
2011: Mart Muru
2012: Marek Niit
2013: Timo Tiismaa
2014: Rait Veesalu
2015: Kaspar Mesila
2016: Timo Tiismaa
2017: Marek Niit
2018: Richard Pulst
2019: Karl Erik Nazarov
2020: Henri Sai
2021: Karl Erik Nazarov
2022: Karl Erik Nazarov

* unofficial championships

Finland

1970: Raimo Vilén
1971: Raimo Vilén
1972: Raimo Vilén
1973: Antti Rajamäki
1974: Antti Rajamäki
1975: Antti Rajamäki
1976: Raimo Räty
1977: Antti Rajamäki
1978: Antti Rajamäki
1979: Ossi Karttunen
1980: Esko Elsilä
1981: Tapani Turunen
1982: Jukka Sihvonen
1983: Kimmo Saaristo
1984: Kimmo Saaristo
1985: Kimmo Saaristo
1986: Kimmo Saaristo
1987: Ari Salonen
1988: Jarkko Toivonen
1989: Kari Niemi
1990: Turo Meriläinen
1991: Sami Länsivuori
1992: Sami Länsivuori
1993: Janne Haapasalo
1994: Ari Pakarinen
1995: Harri Kivelä
1996: Ari Pakarinen
1997: Harri Kivelä
1998: Janne Haapasalo
1999: Kim Lesch
2000: Tuomas Näsi
2001: Kari Louramo
2002: Markus Pöyhönen
2003: Markus Pöyhönen
2004: Stefan Koivikko
2005: Markus Pöyhönen
2006: Visa Hongisto
2007: Nghi Tran
2008: Joni Rautanen
2009: Jarkko Ruostekivi
2010: Joni Rautanen
2011: Hannu Hämäläinen

France

1970: Alain Sarteur
1971: Jean-Pierre Grès
1972: Alain Sarteur
1973: Gilles Echevin
1974: Steve Williams (USA)
1975: Gilles Echevin
1976: Dominique Chauvelot
1977: Lucien Sainte-Rose
1978: Hermann Panzo
1979: Philippe Lejoncour
1980: Hermann Panzo
1981: Antoine Richard
1982: Antoine Richard
1983: Antoine Richard
1984: Bruno Marie-Rose
1985: Antoine Richard
1986: Antoine Richard
1987: Max Morinière
1988: Max Morinière
1989: Bruno Marie-Rose
1990: Daniel Sangouma
1991: Daniel Sangouma
1992: Jean-Charles Trouabal
1993: Jean-Charles Trouabal
1994: Jean-Charles Trouabal
1995: Olivier Théophile
1996: Ibrahim Meité (CIV)
1997: Stéphane Cali
1998: Stéphane Cali
1999: Aimé-Issa Nthépé
2000: David Patros
2001: Frédéric Krantz
2002: Idrissa Sanou (BUR)
2003: Aimé-Issa Nthépé
2004: Aimé-Issa Nthépé
2005: Lueyi Dovy
2006: Ronald Pognon
2007: Lueyi Dovy
2008: Martial Mbandjock
2009: Ronald Pognon
2010: Christophe Lemaitre
2011: Christophe Lemaitre
2012: Christophe Lemaitre
2013: Jimmy Vicaut
2014: Christophe Lemaitre
2015: Jimmy Vicaut

Germany

East Germany

1970: Siegfried Schenke
1971: Siegfried Schenke
1972: Bernd Borth
1973: Hans-Jürgen Bombach
1974: Manfred Kokot
1975: Klaus-Dieter Kurrat
1976: Klaus-Dieter Kurrat
1977: Eugen Ray
1978: Eugen Ray
1979: Olaf Prenzler
1980: Eugen Ray
1981: Frank Emmelmann
1982: Frank Emmelmann
1983: Thomas Schröder
1984: Thomas Schröder
1985: Frank Emmelmann
1986: Thomas Schröder
1987: Steffen Bringmann
1988: Sven Matthes
1989: Steffen Bringmann
1990: Steffen Görmer

West Germany

1970: Günther Nickel
1971: Karl-Heinz Klotz
1972: Manfred Ommer
1973: Jobst Hirscht
1974: Manfred Ommer
1975: Klaus Ehl
1976: Dieter Steinmann
1977: Bernd Sattler
1978: Werner Zaske
1979: Fritz Heer
1980: Christian Haas
1981: Christian Haas
1982: Christian Haas
1983: Christian Haas
1984: Ralf Lübke
1985: Christian Haas
1986: Christian Haas
1987: Christian Haas
1988: Andreas Maul
1989: Wolfgang Haupt
1990: Peter Klein

Unified Germany

1991: Steffen Bringmann
1992: Steffen Bringmann
1993: Marc Blume
1994: Marc Blume
1995: Marc Blume
1996: Marc Blume
1997: Marc Blume
1998: Marc Blume
1999: Holger Blume
2000: Holger Blume
2001: Tim Goebel
2002: Marc Blume
2003: Alexander Kosenkow
2004: Ronny Ostwald
2005: Tobias Unger
2006: Ronny Ostwald
2007: Alexander Kosenkow
2008: Tobias Unger
2009: Tobias Unger
2010: Alexander Kosenkow
2011: Tobias Unger
2012: Lucas Jakubczyk
2013: Julian Reus
2014: Julian Reus
2015: Julian Reus

Great Britain

1970: Brian Green
1971: Brian Green
1972: Brian Green
1973: Don Halliday
1974: Don Halliday
1975: Ainsley Bennett
1976: Allan Wells
1977: Tim Bonsor
1978: Allan Wells
1979: Mike McFarlane
1980: Allan Wells
1981: Drew McMaster
1982: Cameron Sharp
1983: Allan Wells
1984: Donovan Reid
1985: Linford Christie
1986: Linford Christie
1987: John Regis
1988: Linford Christie
1989: Linford Christie
1990: Linford Christie
1991: Linford Christie
1992: Linford Christie
1993: Linford Christie
1994: Linford Christie
1995: Darren Braithwaite
1996: Linford Christie
1997: Jason Gardener
1998: Darren Campbell
1999: Jason Gardener
2000: Dwain Chambers
2001: Dwain Chambers
2002: Mark Lewis-Francis
2003: Darren Campbell
2004: Jason Gardener
2005: Jason Gardener
2006: Marlon Devonish
2007: Marlon Devonish
2008: Dwain Chambers
2009: Simeon Williamson
2010: Dwain Chambers
2011: Dwain Chambers
2012: Dwain Chambers
2013: Dwain Chambers
2014: Dwain Chambers
2015: Chijindu Ujah
2016: James Dasaolu
2017: Reece Prescod
2018: Reece Prescod
2019: Ojie Edoburun

India

1988: Canute Magalhaes
1989: Anand Shetty
1990: Selvaraj Roberts
1991: Selvaraj Roberts
1992: Selvaraj Roberts
1993: M.S. Sridharan
1994: Salaam Gariba GHA
1995:
1996: Amit Khanna
1997:
1998: Amit Khanna
1999: Anil Kumar
2000: Sachin Navale
2001: Anil Kumar
2002: Sanjay Ghosh
2003: Vilas Nilgund
2004: Piyush Kumar
2005: Anil Kumar

Italy

1970: Ennio Preatoni
1971: Norberto Oliosi
1972: Vincenzo Guerini
1973: Luigi Benedetti
1974: Pietro Mennea
1975: Pasqualino Abeti
1976: Vincenzo Guerini
1977: Luciano Caravani
1978: Pietro Mennea
1979: Mauro Zuliani
1980: Pietro Mennea
1981: Diego Nodari
1982: Pierfrancesco Pavoni
1983: Pierfrancesco Pavoni
1984: Stefano Tilli
1985: Carlo Simionato
1986: Stefano Tilli
1987: Pierfrancesco Pavoni
1988: Antonio Ullo
1989: Stefano Tilli
1990: Stefano Tilli
1991: Ezio Madonia
1992: Stefano Tilli
1993: Ezio Madonia
1994: Sandro Floris
1995: Giovanni Puggioni
1996: Giovanni Puggioni
1997: Stefano Tilli
1998: Francesco Scuderi
1999: Andrea Colombo
2000: Francesco Scuderi
2001: Francesco Scuderi
2002: Francesco Scuderi
2003: Francesco Scuderi
2004: Simone Collio
2005: Simone Collio
2006: Luca Verdecchia
2007: Koura Kaba Fantoni
2008: Fabio Cerutti
2009: Simone Collio
2010: Simone Collio
2011: Matteo Galvan
2012: Fabio Cerutti (2)
2013: Delmas Obou
2014: Delmas Obou
2015: Fabio Cerutti
2016: Filippo Tortu
2017: Federico Cattaneo
2018:
2022: Marcell Jacobs

Jamaica

1983: Everald Samuels
1984: Raymond Stewart
1985: ???
1986: Raymond Stewart
1987: Raymond Stewart
1988: Raymond Stewart
1989: Raymond Stewart
1990: John Mair
1991: Raymond Stewart
1992: Raymond Stewart
1993: Michael Green
1994: Michael Green
1995: Michael Green
1996: Michael Green
1997: Percival Spencer
1998: Garth Robinson
1999: Patrick Jarret
2000: Christopher Williams
2001: Lindel Frater
2002: Dwight Thomas
2003: Asafa Powell
2004: Asafa Powell
2005: Asafa Powell
2006: Michael Frater
2007: Asafa Powell
2008: Usain Bolt
2009: Usain Bolt
2010: Oshane Bailey
2011: Asafa Powell
2012: Yohan Blake
2013: Usain Bolt
2014: Nickel Ashmeade
2015: Asafa Powell
2016: Yohan Blake
2017: Yohan Blake
2018: Tyquendo Tracey
2019: Yohan Blake
2020: ???
2021: Tyquendo Tracey

Japan
The information taken from JAAF website.

1970: Masahide Jinno
1971: Masahide Jinno
1972: Takao Ishizawa
1973: Masahide Jinno
1974: Masahide Jinno
1975: Masahide Jinno
1976: Hiromichi Tazaki
1977: Toshio Toyota
1978: Akira Harada
1979: Toshio Toyota
1980: Yasuhiro Harada
1981: Yoshihiro Shimizu
1982: Yoshihiro Shimizu
1983: Hirofumi Miyazaki
1984: Kaoru Matsubara
1985: Hirofumi Miyazaki
1986: Hirofumi Miyazaki
1987: Kaoru Matsubara
1988: Takahiro Kasahara
1989: Shinji Aoto
1990: Robson da Silva (BRA)
1991: Bruny Surin (CAN)
1992: Hisatsugu Suzuki
1993: Satoru Inoue
1994: Satoru Inoue
1995: Yoshitaka Ito
1996: Nobuharu Asahara
1997: Nobuharu Asahara
1998: Koji Ito
1999: Hiroyasu Tsuchie
2000: Nobuharu Asahara
2001: Nobuharu Asahara
2002: Nobuharu Asahara
2003: Shingo Suetsugu
2004: Shingo Suetsugu
2005: Shinya Saburi
2006: Naoki Tsukahara
2007: Naoki Tsukahara
2008: Naoki Tsukahara
2009: Masashi Eriguchi
2010: Masashi Eriguchi
2011: Masashi Eriguchi
2012: Masashi Eriguchi
2013: Ryota Yamagata
2014: Yoshihide Kiryu
2015: Kei Takase
2016: Asuka Cambridge
2017: Abdul Hakim Sani Brown
2018: Ryota Yamagata
2019: Abdul Hakim Sani Brown
2020: Yoshihide Kiryu
2021: Shuhei Tada
2022: Abdul Hakim Sani Brown

Latvia

1991: Aleksejs Iljušinš
1992: Guntis Zâlîtis
1993: Guntis Zâlîtis
1994: Alberts Baturins
1995: Sergejs Inšakovs
1996: Sergejs Inšakovs
1997: Sergejs Inšakovs
1998: Ingūns Svikliņš
1999: Stanislavs Olijars
2000: Sergejs Inšakovs
2001: Sergejs Inšakovs
2002: Sergejs Inšakovs
2003: Sandis Sabâjevs
2004: Dmitrijs Hadakovs
2005: Sandis Sabâjevs
2006: Ronalds Arājs 
2007: ???
2008: Māris Grēniņš
2009: Ronalds Arājs
2010: Ronalds Arājs

Lithuania

1990: Eimantas Skrabulis
1991: Vilmantas Pipiras
1992: Kastytis Klimas
1993: Kastytis Klimas
1994: Vilmantas Pipiras
1995: Saulius Urbutis
1996: Donatas Jakševicius
1997: Donatas Jakševicius
1998: Donatas Jakševicius
1999: Stanislav Michno
2000: Ilja Andriusenko
2001: Sigitas Kavaliauskas
2002: Dainius Šerpytis
2003: Andrius Kacénas
2004: Andrius Kacénas
2005: Justas Buragas
2006: Rytis Sakalauskas
2007: Žilvinas Adomavičius
2008: Rytis Sakalauskas
2009: Rytis Sakalauskas
2010: Martas Skrabulis

Netherlands

1970: Ad de Jong
1971: Eddy Monsels (SUR)
1972: Bert de Jager
1973: Bert de Jager
1974: Bert de Jager
1975: Sammy Monsels (SUR)
1976: Bert de Jager
1977: Bert de Jager
1978: Raymond Heerenveen (AHO)
1979: Raymond Heerenveen (AHO)
1980: Ed Pireau
1981: Ed Pireau
1982: Mario Westbroek
1983: Sammy Monsels (SUR)
1984: Peter van der Heyden
1985: Peter van der Heyden
1986: Ahmed de Kom
1987: Ahmed de Kom
1988: Ahmed de Kom
1989: Emiel Mellaard
1990: Paul Franklin
1991: Paul Franklin
1992: Frank Perri
1993: Frank Perri
1994: Regilio van der Vloot
1995: Regilio van der Vloot
1996: Patrick van Balkom
1997: Patrick van Balkom
1998: Patrick van Balkom
1999: Nathanael Esprit (AHO)
2000: Martin Ungerer
2001: Troy Douglas
2002: Troy Douglas
2003: Timothy Beck
2004: Troy Douglas
2005: Guus Hoogmoed
2006: Caimin Douglas (AHO)
2007: Guus Hoogmoed
2008: Patrick van Luijk
2009: Patrick van Luijk
2010: Caimin Douglas (AHO)
2011: Churandy Martina
2012: Churandy Martina
2013: Churandy Martina
2014: Churandy Martina
2015: Churandy Martina
2016: Churandy Martina

New Zealand

1970: Laurie D'Arcy
1971: Bevan Smith
1972: Laurie D'Arcy
1973: Steve Erkkila
1974: Bevan Smith
1975: Steve Erkkila
1976: Ross Pownall
1977: Steve Erkkila
1978: Graeme French
1979: Shane Downey
1980: Peter Hunt
1981: Shane Downey
1982: Gary Henley-Smith
1983: Gary Henley-Smith
1984: Joe Leota
1985: Rhys Dacre
1986: Dale McClunie
1987: Shane Downey
1988: Simon Poelman
1989: Murray Gutry
1990: Mark Woods
1991: Augustine Nketia (GHA)
1992: Augustine Nketia
1993: Augustine Nketia
1994: Augustine Nketia
1995: Mark Keddell
1996: Augustine Nketia
1997: Chris Donaldson
1998: Matthew Coad
1999: Chris Donaldson
2000: Chris Donaldson
2001: Matthew Coad
2002: James Dolphin
2003: Donald MacDonald
2004: Donald MacDonald
2005: James Dolphin
2006: James Dolphin
2007: James Dolphin + Chris Donaldson
2008: Chris Donaldson
2009: C. Van der Speck
2010: C. Van der Speck
2011: C. Van der Speck
2012: Joseph Millar
2013: Joseph Millar
2014: Joseph Millar
2015: Kodi Harman
2016: Matthew Wyatt

Nigeria

2005: Uchenna Emedolu
2008: Obinna Metu
2009: Obinna Metu
2010: Obinna Metu
2011: Ogho-Oghene Egwero
2012: Obinna Metu
2013: Ogho-Oghene Egwero
2014: Mark Jelks
2015: Seye Ogunlewe

Norway

1970: Richard Simonsen
1971: Ole Egil Reitan
1972: Audun Garshol
1973: Audun Garshol
1974: Audun Garshol
1975: Audun Garshol
1976: Audun Garshol
1977: Øyvind Røst
1978: Knut M. Stokke
1979: Knut M. Stokke
1980: Kåre Magne Åmot
1981: Kåre Magne Åmot
1982: Tore Bergan
1983: Tore Bergan
1984: Tore Bergan
1985: Einar Sagli
1986: Einar Sagli
1987: Aham Okeke
1988: Einar Sagli
1989: Geir Moen
1990: Aham Okeke
1991: Aham Okeke
1992: Geir Moen
1993: Geir Moen
1994: Geir Moen
1995: Geir Moen
1996: Geir Moen
1997: Geir Moen
1998: Geir Moen
1999: Geir Moen
2000: John Ertzgaard
2001: John Ertzgaard
2002: Geir Moen
2003: Aham Okeke
2004: Aham Okeke
2005: Martin Rypdal
2006: Martin Rypdal
2007: Jaysuma Saidy Ndure
2008: Jaysuma Saidy Ndure
2009: Christian Mogstad

Poland

1970: Zenon Nowosz
1971: Wiesław Maniak
1972: Hermes Ramírez (CUB)
1973: Zenon Nowosz
1974: Andrzej Świerczyński
1975: Andrzej Świerczyński
1976: Zenon Licznerski
1977: Zenon Licznerski
1978: Marian Woronin
1979: Marian Woronin
1980: Marian Woronin
1981: Marian Woronin
1982: Marian Woronin
1983: Marian Woronin
1984: Leszek Dunecki
1985: Marian Woronin
1986: Czesław Prądzyński
1987: Czesław Prądzyński
1988: Marian Woronin
1989: Jacek Marlicki
1990: Jacek Marlicki
1991: Jarosław Kaniecki
1992: Marek Zalewski
1993: Marek Zalewski
1994: Marek Zalewski
1995: Marek Zalewski
1996: Ryszard Pilarczyk
1997: Ryszard Pilarczyk
1998: Marcin Krzywański
1999: Piotr Balcerzak
2000: Marcin Nowak
2001: Marcin Krzywański
2002: Marcin Urbaś
2003: Marcin Jędrusiński
2004: Łukasz Chyła
2005: Michał Bielczyk
2006: Dariusz Kuć
2007: Marcin Jędrusiński
2008: Dariusz Kuć
2009: Dariusz Kuć
2010: Robert Kubaczyk
2011: Paweł Stempel
2012: Dariusz Kuć
2013: Karol Zalewski
2014: Karol Zalewski
2015: Przemysław Słowikowski
2016: Karol Zalewski
2017: Karol Zalewski
2018: Dominik Kopeć
2019: Dominik Kopeć

Portugal

1970: Paulo Pereira
1971: António Fonseca e Silva
1972: João Jorge
1973: António Manso
1974: António Cachola
1975: António Cachola
1976: Vítor Mano
1977: Vítor Mano
1978: Vítor Mano
1979: Vítor Mano
1980: Daniel Monteiro
1981: Daniel Monteiro
1982: António Cachola
1983: Luís Barroso
1984: Luís Barroso
1985: Luís Barroso
1986: Arnaldo Abrantes
1987: Luís Barroso
1988: Pedro Agostinho
1989: Paulo Curvelo
1990: Pedro Agostinho
1991: Pedro Agostinho
1992: Luís Cunha
1993: Pedro Agostinho
1994: Luís Cunha
1995: Luís Cunha
1996: Carlos Calado
1997: Mário Barbosa
1998: Mário Barbosa
1999: Carlos Calado
2000: Ricardo Alves
2001: Ricardo Alves
2002: Hidberto Almeida
2003: Ricardo Alves
2004: Francis Obikwelu
2005: Francis Obikwelu
2006: Francis Obikwelu
2007: Arnaldo Abrantes
2008: João Ferreira
2009: Francis Obikwelu
2010: Francis Obikwelu
2011: Yazaldes Nascimento
2012:  Carlos Nascimento
2013: Yazaldes Nascimento
2014: Yazaldes Nascimento
2015: Yazaldes Nascimento
2016: Diogo Antunes
2017: Diogo Antunes
2018:  Carlos Nascimento
2019: Diogo Antunes
2020: José Pedro Lopes

Russia

1992: Aleksandr Porkhomovskiy
1993: Aleksandr Porkhomovskiy
1994: Aleksandr Porkhomovskiy
1995: Andrey Grigoryev
1996: Andrey Fedoriv
1997: Andrey Fedoriv
1998: Aleksandr Porkhomovskiy
1999: Sergey Slukin
2000: Sergey Bychkov
2001: Sergey Bychkov
2002: Sergey Bychkov
2003: Aleksandr Smirnov
2004: Andrey Yepishin
2005: Andrey Yepishin
2006: Andrey Yepishin

South Africa

2009: Simon Magakwe
2010: Simon Magakwe
2011: Simon Magakwe
2013: Simon Magakwe
2014: Simon Magakwe
2015: Akani Simbine
2016: Henricho Bruintjies

Spain 

1970: Juan Carlos Jones
1971: Sánchez Paraíso
1972: Sánchez Paraíso
1973: Sánchez Paraíso
1974: José Luis Sarriá
1975: Josep Carbonell
1976: Javier Martínez
1977: Ángel Ibáñez
1978: José Luis Sarriá
1979: Sánchez Paraíso
1980: Javier Martínez
1981: Josep Carbonell
1982: Javier Martínez
1983: Juan José Prado
1984: Javier Arques
1985: Javier Arques
1986: Javier Arques
1987: Javier Arques
1988: Javier Arques
1989: Javier Arques
1990: Enrique Talavera
1991: Enrique Talavera
1992: Sergio López
1993: Enrique Talavera
1994: Pedro Pablo Nolet
1995: Francisco Javier Navarro
1996: Venancio José
1997: Frutos Feo
1998: Frutos Feo
1999: Pedro Pablo Nolet
2000: Venancio José
2001: Diego Moisés Santos
2002: Orkatz Beitia
2003: Orkatz Beitia
2004: Iván Mocholí
2005: Orkatz Beitia
2006: A. David Rodríguez
2007: A. David Rodríguez
2008: Iván Mocholí
2009: A. David Rodríguez
2010: A. David Rodríguez
2011: A. David Rodríguez
2012: A. David Rodríguez
2013: A. David Rodríguez
2014: Adrià Burriel
2015: A. David Rodríguez
2016: A. David Rodríguez
2017: A. David Rodríguez

Sweden

1970: Anders Faager
1971: Thorsten Johansson
1972: Anders Faager
1973: Thorsten Johansson
1974: Christer Garpenborg
1975: Christer Garpenborg
1976: Christer Garpenborg
1977: Christer Garpenborg
1978: Christer Garpenborg
1979: Christer Garpenborg
1980: Dan Orbe
1981: Christer Garpenborg
1982: Stefan Nilsson
1983: Stefan Nilsson
1984: Tommy Johansson
1985: Per-Ola Olsson
1986: Peter Eriksson
1987: Robert Nilsson
1988: Thomas Leandersson
1989: Marty Krulee (USA)
1990: Marty Krulee (USA)
1991: Marty Krulee (USA)
1992: Thomas Leandersson
1993: Peter Karlsson
1994: Peter Karlsson
1995: Matias Ghansah
1996: Peter Karlsson
1997: Torbjörn Mårtensson
1998: Patrik Lövgren
1999: Lenny Martinez
2000: Torbjörn Mårtensson
2001: Mikael Ahl
2002: Patrik Lövgren
2003: Johan Engberg
2004: Johan Wissman
2005: Per Strandquist
2006: Daniel Persson

Trinidad and Tobago

1970: Keith Holder
1971: -
1972: Hasely Crawford
1973: Ainsley Armstrong
1974: Charles Joseph
1975: Hasely Crawford
1976: Hasely Crawford
1977: Ephraim Serrette
1978: Christopher Brathwaite
1979: Hasely Crawford
1980: Hasely Crawford
1981: Ephraim Serrette
1982: Alexander Smith
1983: Christopher Brathwaite
1984: ???
1985: Anthony Munroe
1986: Ronnell Barclay
1987: Dazel Jules
1988: Ronnell Barclay
1989: ???
1990: -
1991: ???
1992: ???
1993: Ato Boldon
1994: Ato Boldon
1995: Alvin Daniel
1996: Wendell Williams
1997: Errol Lewis
1998: Niconnor Alexander
1999: Niconnor Alexander
2000: Niconnor Alexander
2001: Darrel Brown
2002: Marc Burns
2003: Jacey Harper
2004: Ato Boldon
2005: Marc Burns
2006: Jacey Harper
2007: Darrel Brown
2008: Marc Burns
2009: Richard Thompson
2010: Richard Thompson
2011: Richard Thompson
2012: Keston Bledman
2013: Keston Bledman
2014: Richard Thompson
2015: Keston Bledman

Ukraine 

1992: Kostyantyn Gromadskyi
1993: Oleksandr Shlychkov
1994: Vladyslav Dolohodin
1995: Oleksiy Chykhachov
1996: Serhiy Osovych
1997: Vladyslav Dolohodin
1998: Anatoliy Dovhal
1999: Kostyantyn Rurak
2000: Kostyantyn Rurak
2001: Anatoliy Dovgal
2002: Kostyantyn Rurak
2003: Kostyantyn Rurak
2004: Anatoliy Dovhal
2005: Anatoliy Dovhal
2006: Anatoliy Dovhal
2007: Dmytro Hlushchenko
2008: Dmytro Hlushchenko
2009: Kostyantyn Vasyukov
2010: Serhiy Smelyk
2011: Ihor Bodrov
2012: Serhiy Smelyk
2013: Vitaliy Korzh
2014: Ihor Bodrov
2015: Vitaliy Korzh
2016: Ihor Bodrov
2017: Serhiy Smelyk
2018: Serhiy Smelyk
2019: Stanislav Kovalenko
2020: Oleksandr Sokolov

United States

1970: Ivory Crockett
1971: Del Meriwether
1972: Robert Taylor
1973: Steve Williams
1974: Steve Williams
1975: Don Quarrie (JAM)
1976: Christer Garpenborg (SWE)
1977: Don Quarrie (JAM)
1978: Clancy Edwards
1979: James Sanford
1980: Stanley Floyd
1981: Carl Lewis
1982: Carl Lewis
1983: Carl Lewis
1984: Sam Graddy
1985: Kirk Baptiste
1986: Carl Lewis
1987: Mark Witherspoon
1988: Emmit King
1989: Leroy Burrell
1990: Carl Lewis
1991: Leroy Burrell
1992: Dennis Mitchell
1993: Andre Cason
1994: Dennis Mitchell
1995: Michael Marsh
1996: Dennis Mitchell
1997: Maurice Greene
1998: Tim Harden
1999: Brian Lewis
2000: Maurice Greene
2001: Bernard Williams
2002: Maurice Greene
2003: Bernard Williams
2004: Maurice Greene
2005: Justin Gatlin
2006: Tyson Gay
2007: Tyson Gay
2008: Tyson Gay
2009: Mike Rodgers
2010: Walter Dix
2011: Walter Dix
2012: Justin Gatlin
2013: Justin Gatlin
2014: Mike Rodgers
2015: Tyson Gay
2016: Justin Gatlin
2017: Justin Gatlin
2018: Noah Lyles
2019: Christian Coleman
2020: Cancelled due to COVID-19
2021: Trayvon Bromell
2022: Fred Kerley

References

GBRathletics
New Zealand Champions
 Historial de campeones en el Campeonato de España al aire libre.

Men
national champions
100 metres